This article lists the fixtures of the group stage for the 2018 Uber Cup in Bangkok, Thailand.

All times Thailand Standard Time (UTC+07:00)

Group A

Teams

Standings

Matches

Japan vs Australia

India vs Canada

Japan vs Canada

India vs Australia

Japan vs India

Canada vs Australia

Group B

Teams

Standings

Matches

Chinese Taipei vs Hong Kong

Thailand vs Germany

Thailand vs Hong Kong

Chinese Taipei vs Germany

Thailand vs Chinese Taipei

Hong Kong vs Germany

Group C

Teams

Standings

Matches

Korea vs Mauritius

Denmark vs Russia

Denmark vs Mauritius

Korea vs Russia

Korea vs Denmark

Russia vs Mauritius

Group D

Teams

Standings

Matches

China vs France

Indonesia vs Malaysia

China vs Malaysia

Indonesia vs France

China vs Indonesia

Malaysia vs France

References

Uber Group stage